Proto-Zionism (or Forerunner of Zionism; , pronounced: Mevasrei ha-Tzionut) is a term attributed to the ideas of a group of men deeply affected by the idea of modern nationalism spread in Europe in the 19th century as they sought to establish a Jewish homeland in the Land of Israel. The central activity of these men was between the years 1860 to 1874, before the Zionist movement established practical (1881) and political Zionism (1896). It is for this reason that they are called precursors of Zionism, or proto-Zionists.

While the 17th century raised the overall idea, among Jews and non-Jews, of "restoring the Jews to Israel naturally by settlement and political action," the ultimate goal was not yet clearly defined. These ideas did not unite people to action and relied on the national project and the State (the Jewish nation). Therefore, the figures behind these ideas are not considered as Heralds of Zionism.

This group of men considered as proto-Zionists includes Rabbi Judah Bibas (1789-1852), Rabbi Judah ben Solomon Hai Alkalai (1798–1878), Rabbi Zvi Hirsch Kalischer (1795–1874), and philosopher Moses Hess (1812–1875).

Background
Muhammad Ali seized power of Ottoman Egypt in 1805 following a civil war between the reigning Mamluks and Ottomans. Muhammad Ali dreamed of a new Egypt rising from the ashes of Ottoman decline: "I am well aware that the (Ottoman) Empire is heading by the day toward destruction... On its ruins I will build a vast kingdom... up to the Euphrates and the Tigris". He envisioned the Levant as the bread basket of Egypt, supplying Egypt with agricultural production and conscripts for their wars against the Ottomans. Most of the Muslim Arab peasantry in Palestine turned against Ibrahim pasha as his constant demands for conscript soldiers came to be seen as a death sentence leading to the 1834 Peasants' revolt in Palestine. This was the backdrop against which proto-Zionism developed as more Jews started immigrating to the region under Ibrahim pasha's rule. After the Ottomans regained control of the Levant in the Oriental Crisis of 1840 the legal structures of land ownership underwent significant reform in the Tanzimat era beginning with the Land Code of 1858. Once based on cultivation, land ownership was now based on title and register, paving the way for later land purchases by Zionists.

History
The medieval Jewish Torah scholar Maimonides advocated a re-establishment of Jewish sovereignty in the Land of Israel in a lengthy preface to his 13 principles of faith. He wrote that Jewish national independence would come about through natural means and argued for political activism to bring it about. Likewise, the medieval Jewish philosopher Judah HaLevi also espoused Proto-Zionist ideas, writing that only in the Land of Israel could Jews be truly secure.

According to Ben-Zion Dinur, the aliyah of Judah HeHasid and his group in 1700 opened a new era which began to develop processes such as encouraging productivity, the revival of the Hebrew language and national aspirations. Nahum Sokolow described proto-Zionists as anyone who wished to renew the Jewish community in the Land of Israel, or who wrote about the Jewish problem, starting from the 17th century. This broad definition included such figures as Moses Montefiore, Adolphe Crémieux, Eliezer Ben-Yehuda and Sabbatai Zevi. Nathan Michael Gerber also traced the forerunners of Zionism back to the 17th century.

According to Arie Morgenstern, the Vilna Gaon of Lithuania, Elijah ben Solomon Zalman (1720-1797), promoted a teaching from the Zohar (book of Jewish mysticism) citing the prediction that “the gates of wisdom above and the founts of wisdom below will open” "after six hundred years of the sixth millennium" i.e. after the year 5600 of the Jewish calendar (1839-1840 AD).  Many understood this to imply the coming of the Messiah at that time. This early wave of Jewish migration to the Holy Land began in 1808 and became dominant until 1840.  Although the Messiah did not appear, the Ottoman government took control of Palestine from the Egyptians in 1840, and its recently established rights for all Ottoman citizens—regardless of religion—was thus extended to the non-Muslim populations of Palestine, including the Jewish people there.  The right to purchase and own land was a particularly significant, if less noticed, milepost in the return of the Jewish people to the Holy Land.

According to Dov Weinereve, the first "forerunner" is Mordecai Manuel Noah.

Jacob Katz argued that it is possible to point out only on three men as "forerunners of Zionism": Rabbi Judah ben Solomon Hai Alkalai, Rabbi Zvi Hirsch Kalischer, a thinker Moses Hess, since although other people acted in various forms, it is just these three's actions that left the imprint on the Hovevei Zion.  Samuel Leib Zitron cited  Rabbi Alkalai as the pioneer of modern political Zionism.

Citron and Samuel Ettinger, who argued that even if preceded by the movement of Hovevei Zion were different personalities who tackled the Jewish problem, the few acts that they were at hand to do did not leave an impression for generations, did not affect anything on the Zionist movement, and thus there is no person that could be called "harbinger of Zionism".

Zionism's precursors
The Vilna Gaon (1720-1797) was one of the chief promoters of the idea that the passage from the Zohar mentioned above indicated that the Messiah would return in 1840.  Groups of his followers ("Perushim") started to arrive in the Holy Land in 1808.
 Judah Bibas was a Gibraltar-born Rabbi, who served as the Chief Rabbi of Corfu. Bibas visited Jewish Communities all over Europe, and he encouraged Jews to make Aliyah to Palestine.
 Moses Hess was influenced by the idea of modern nationalism and in 1862 he published his Rome and Jerusalem. Hess, who was secular and a former revolutionary socialist, rediscovered the cultural and political origins of Judaism, all in order to draw out ideas for the modern Jewish national movement.
 Yehuda Alkalai was a Spanish rabbi from the Balkans and a student of Rabbi Yehuda Bibas who was infused with Christian ideas about the end of redemption and deeply influenced by the political success of Adolphe Crémieux and Moses Montefiore and the Damascus affair, in 1840.
 Zvi Hirsch Kalischer was a German of Polish origin who believed that the emancipation - the granting of equal rights to Jews, at least practically, was part of the process of redemption.

Katz argues that the rabbis Alkalai and Kalisher changed their religious worldview, abandoning the "Basics of non - realistic perception of traditional Messianic views".

He also explains that during their actions as forerunners of Zionism there "was not on the agenda an issue of lack of rights to Jews or social discrimination"  and thus the modern idea of Jewish nationalism was not a success in the years they operated. From the late '70s, with growing economic plight of Eastern European Jews and the rising wave of anti-Semitism, two and a half million Jews left Eastern Europe (until World War I), while only a small percentage of them emigrated to Israel.

See also
History of Zionism
Pre-Modern Aliyah
Return to Zion
Yom HaAliyah
Benedetto Musolino

References

 
Zionism
Political theories